Marcos Alberto Skavinski , commonly known as  Marcão  (born 28 March 1975 in Curitiba), is a Brazilian football coach and former player who played as a central defender. He is the current head coach of Paraná.

Club statistics

Honours
São Paulo State League (2nd division): 2000
Paraná State League: 2005
Sul-Americana Cup: 2008
Dubai Cup: 2008
Rio Grande Do Sul State League: 2008

Contract
5 January 2010 to 31 December 2010

External links

 CBF
 furacao.com interview
 furucao.com profile
 sambafoot.com
 rubronegro.net
 zerozero.pt
 Guardian Stats Centre

1975 births
Footballers from Curitiba
Living people
Brazilian footballers
Brazilian expatriate footballers
Coritiba Foot Ball Club players
Associação Desportiva São Caetano players
Clube Atlético Mineiro players
Esporte Clube Santo André players
Esporte Clube Juventude players
Club Athletico Paranaense players
Ittihad FC players
Kawasaki Frontale players
J1 League players
Expatriate footballers in Japan
Sport Club Internacional players
Sociedade Esportiva Palmeiras players
Brazilian people of Polish descent
Goiás Esporte Clube players
Saudi Professional League players
Association football midfielders
Brazilian football managers
Paraná Clube managers